Jalil Brown (born October 14, 1987) is an American football coach, and former cornerback. He played college football at the University of Colorado at Boulder, and was selected in the fourth round of the 2011 NFL Draft by the Kansas City Chiefs. Brown was also a member of the Indianapolis Colts and Miami Dolphins.

College career
Brown attended the University of Colorado at Boulder where he finished his career with 167 career tackles, six interceptions, and 21 pass deflections.

After his senior season, he was invited to play in the 2011 Senior Bowl.

Professional career

Kansas City Chiefs
Brown was selected with the 118th overall pick in the 2011 NFL Draft by the Kansas City Chiefs. After the season, Brown had 8 tackles. He also has 1 fumble recovery against the New York Jets. Brown`s best game during the season was against the New England Patriots, where he had 3 tackles. The Chiefs waived him in the last round of cuts on September 1, 2013.

Indianapolis Colts
Brown was signed by the Indianapolis Colts on October 22, 2013 after placing Reggie Wayne on injured reserve. After appearing in five games for the Colts, Brown was waived by the Colts on December 14, 2013.

Miami Dolphins
Brown signed with the Miami Dolphins on December 16, 2013. The Dolphins waived Brown on August 22, 2014. and he reverted to the team's injured reserve list after being unclaimed.

Second stint with Indianapolis
On September 30, 2014, Brown signed with the Indianapolis Colts. He was released on November 4, 2014.

Second stint with Miami
Brown re-signed with the Miami Dolphins on November 15, 2014.

Third stint with Indianapolis
On November 27, 2014, the Indianapolis Colts waived cornerback Louchiez Purifoy and signed Brown for a third time. Brown was placed on injured reserve on October 7, 2015. Brown was released on October 13, 2015. Brown was re-signed by the Colts on December 8, 2015. On September 4, 2016, he was released by the Colts.

Coaching career

Boise State
Brown was hired as a strength and conditioning coach for their 2017 season.

Northern Arizona
On February 21, 2018, Brown was hired as the cornerbacks coach for Northern Arizona.

References

External links
Colorado Buffaloes bio

1987 births
Living people
American football cornerbacks
Colorado Buffaloes football players
Kansas City Chiefs players
Indianapolis Colts players
Miami Dolphins players
Players of American football from Phoenix, Arizona